List of ministers in Government of Rajasthan

Chief Minister & Cabinet Ministers

State Ministers (Independent Charge)

State Ministers

References

Raje 02
2003 in Indian politics
Bharatiya Janata Party state ministries
2013 establishments in Rajasthan
2016 disestablishments in India
Cabinets established in 2013
Cabinets disestablished in 2016